is a passenger railway station located in the Takebe-chō neighborhood of Kita-ku of the city of Okayama, Okayama Prefecture, Japan. It is operated by West Japan Railway Company (JR West).

Lines

Station layout
The station consists of two ground-level opposed side platforms connected by a level crossing. The station is unattended.

Platforms

Adjacent stations

History
Nonokuchi Station opened on December 21, 1898 with the opening of the Tsuyama Line.  With the privatization of the Japan National Railways (JNR) on April 1, 1987, the station came under the aegis of the West Japan Railway Company. The station building was rebuilt in February 2020.

Passenger statistics
In fiscal 2019, the station was used by an average of 134 passengers daily..

Surrounding area
Kabaya Foods Head Office/Okayama Factory
Okayama Municipal Mitsuminami Elementary School
Japan National Route 53

See also
List of railway stations in Japan

References

External links

 Nonokuchi Station Official Site

Railway stations in Okayama
Tsuyama Line
Railway stations in Japan opened in 1898